Ridgeport is an unincorporated community in Boone County, in the U.S. state of Iowa. An old variant name was "Mineral Ridge".

History
Ridgeport was originally called "Mineral Ridge", and under the latter name was platted in 1854, taking its name from the ridge upon which the town site is situated. A post office called Mineral Ridge was established in 1854, and remained in operation until 1913.

References

Unincorporated communities in Boone County, Iowa
1854 establishments in Iowa